Leander Paes and Miguel Ángel Reyes-Varela were the defending champions but only Reyes-Varela chose to defend his title, partnering Marcelo Arévalo. Reyes-Varela lost in the semifinals to Orlando Luz and Luis David Martínez.

Ariel Behar and Gonzalo Escobar won the title after defeating Luz and Martínez 6–7(5–7), 6–4, [12–10] in the final.

Seeds

Draw

References

External links
 Main draw

Milex Open - Doubles
2019 Doubles